Christopher Brian Bridges (born September 11, 1977), known professionally as Ludacris (homophonous with 'ludicrous' in American English), is an American rapper, actor, and record executive. Born in Champaign, Illinois, Ludacris moved to Atlanta, Georgia, at age nine where he first began rapping. Starting out with a brief stint as a DJ. He formed his own record label, Disturbing tha Peace in the late 1990s, and his first album Incognegro (1999). The album was repackaged and re-released for his major label debut Back for the First Time, after he signed with Def Jam Recordings.

The singles "Southern Hospitality" (featuring Pharrell) and "What's Your Fantasy" (featuring Shawnna), became top 40 hits on the Billboard Hot 100 chart. He then released the albums Word of Mouf (2001), Chicken-n-Beer (2003) and The Red Light District (2004), all of which were certified multi-platinum by the Recording Industry Association of America (RIAA). His next two albums Release Therapy (2006) and Theater of the Mind (2008), explored more serious content than its predecessors. In 2010, he was featured on Justin Bieber's single "Baby", which became one of the highest-certified singles of all time in the US and a defining song in modern-day popular music. His seventh album, Battle of the Sexes (2010), featured a return to the more lighthearted tone of his previous albums.

As an actor, Ludacris is best known for his role as Tej Parker in the Fast and Furious film series, with his first appearance in the franchise coming in 2003. His other notable roles include Crash (2004), Gamer (2009), and New Year's Eve (2011). In 2021, Bridges created his own children's musical television series for Netflix known as Karma's World, in which he also served as a voice actor. Ludacris is also a private pilot.

He is often cited as one of the first Dirty South rappers to achieve mainstream success in the 21st century, with several commercially and critically successful studio albums. Throughout his career, Ludacris has won three Grammy Awards, a Screen Actors Guild Award, a Critic's Choice Award and an MTV Video Music Award.

Early life
Born Christopher Brian Bridges in Champaign, Illinois, Ludacris moved to Oak Park as a teenager. After attending Oak Park River Forest High School in ninth grade, Ludacris moved to Centreville, Virginia and attended Centreville High School for one year. He attended Banneker High School in Atlanta, Georgia and graduated in 1995. From 1998 to 1999, he studied music management at Georgia State University. Ludacris' parents are both African American, and he also has more distant English and Native American ancestry. He is a distant cousin of late comedian Richard Pryor. Ludacris wrote his first rap song at age nine when moving to Atlanta, Georgia, and joined an amateur rap group three years later.

Music career

1998–2000: Incognegro and Back for the First Time
Ludacris served as an intern and then a DJ at Atlanta's Hot 97.5 (now Hot 107.9) under the name "Chris Lova Lova". During his radio career, Ludacris met music producer Timbaland, whose album Tim's Bio: Life from da Bassment would feature Ludacris on the track "Phat Rabbit" (credited as Ludichris).

Speaking with MTV's hip hop show Direct Effect in 2000, Ludacris explained his stage name was a play on the word "ludicrous".

In 1999, Ludacris released his debut album Incognegro through his independent label Disturbing tha Peace. Def Jam South would later repackage Incognegro with some new songs added into Ludacris's major label debut Back for the First Time in 2000. The album reached number four on the U.S. Billboard 200 and included the singles "What's Your Fantasy" (featuring Shawnna) and "Southern Hospitality" (featuring Pharrell Williams), which respectively reached the nos. 21 and 23 spots on the Billboard Hot 100.

2001–2003: Word of Mouf and Chicken-n-Beer
In 2001, Ludacris contributed the hit single Area Codes" (featuring Nate Dogg)” to the soundtrack to the film Rush Hour 2. It was also included on his next album, Word of Mouf, released later that year. The Word of Mouf lead single "Rollout (My Business)" was nominated for the Grammy Award for Best Male Rap Solo Performance in the 2003 Grammy Awards. Two other singles reached the Hot 100 in 2002: "Saturday (Oooh Oooh)" featuring Sleepy Brown" peaked at no. 22, and  "Move Bitch" featuring Mystikal and I-20 peaked at no. 10.

Ludacris also had guest spots on hit singles throughout 2001 and 2002, such as Jermaine Dupri's "Welcome to Atlanta" that peaked at no. 35 on the Hot 100 and no. 15 on the Hot R&B/Hip-Hop chart. Ludacris was among multiple featured rappers on "Bia' Bia'" by Lil Jon and the East Side Boyz, which peaked at no. 47 on the R&B/Hip-Hop chart in August 2001. In the last week of 2002, "Gossip Folks" by Missy Elliott featuring Ludacris was released as a single. It peaked at no. 8 on the Hot 100 in March 2003.

In April 2003, Ludacris released single "Act a Fool" from the soundtrack of the movie 2 Fast 2 Furious, where Ludacris played Tej Parker.
In the fall of 2003, Ludacris released his next album ‘’Chicken-N-Beer”. Guest appearances included Playaz Circle, Chingy, Snoop Dogg, 8Ball & MJG, Lil' Flip, I-20, Lil Fate, and Shawnna. The single, "Stand Up" appeared on both Chicken-n-Beer as well as the soundtrack for the teen hip hop/dance movie You Got Served. Produced by Kanye West, "Stand Up" went on to become one of Ludacris' biggest mainstream hits to date, hitting the top spot on the Billboard Hot 100 garnering heavy airplay on mainstream pop, rhythmic, and urban radio stations, as well as on MTV, MTV2, and BET. Ludacris was sued by a New Jersey group called I.O.F. who claimed that "Stand Up" used a hook from one of their songs, but in June 2006, a jury found that the song did not violate copyrights. "I hope the plaintiffs enjoyed their 15 minutes of fame," Ludacris said after the verdict.

The album's next single, "Splash Waterfalls", was released in early 2004. A huge pop hit (despite its steamy video and explicit, adult-oriented lyrical content and themes), it subsequently became a success at urban radio and BET, and is the only time he has produced two consecutive top 10 singles from a solo album,  except for Release Therapy (an unedited version of the video could only be viewed on BET's Uncut program). It was Ludacris' most sexual video yet, an R&B remix that featured Raphael Saadiq and sampled Tony! Toni! Tone!'s "Whatever You Want". Ludacris received his first Grammy Award with Usher and Lil Jon for their hit single "Yeah!". Ludacris next released "Blow It Out", which was accompanied by a low-budget music video.

2004–2007: The Red Light District and Release Therapy

Ludacris took a more mature approach to his fourth album The Red Light District. Sohail Khalid helped produce this album with various artists such as T.I., Lil Flip and Bun B. Ludacris openly boasted that he may be the only rapper able to keep the Def Jam label afloat on the opening track. Ludacris filmed and recorded the single "Get Back" in which he was featured as a muscle-bound hulk who was being annoyed by the media and warned critics to leave him alone. He first appeared on Saturday Night Live as a special guest performing with musical guest Sum 41 on a season 30 episode hosted by Paul Giamatti. He then recorded "Get Back" with Sum 41 to make a rock crossover single. The follow-up single was the Austin Powers-inspired "Number One Spot". It was produced by New York City's Hot 97 personality DJ Green Lantern. It used the Quincy Jones sample of "Soul Bossa Nova" and sped it up to the tempo of Ludacris' rap flow. Featured artists on the album include Nas, DJ Quik, DMX, Trick Daddy, Sleepy Brown and Disturbing tha Peace newcomers Bobby Valentino, Dolla Boi and Small World. The album debuted at number one on the Billboard charts.

In an issue of XXL, Ludacris was placed in the number nine spot for the most anticipated albums of 2006, for Release Therapy. The album Release Therapy was released on September 26, 2006. Ludacris formatted the CD to have two sides: a Release side and a Therapy side on a single CD. Guest appearances include Pharrell Williams, R. Kelly, Young Jeezy, Mary J. Blige, Field Mob, Bobby Valentino, Pimp C, C-Murder and Beanie Sigel. The first single, "Money Maker", which features Williams, was released to U.S. radio outlets on July 17, 2006. "Money Maker" reached number one on the BET program 106 & Park. It then went to become the rapper's second number-one single after 6 years. His second single, "Grew Up a Screw Up", featuring Young Jeezy, dispels rumors that the two are or ever were in a dispute. His third single, "Runaway Love", soon peaked at number one on the U.S. Billboard Hot Rap Tracks and won Best Collaboration in the 2007 BET Awards. Release Therapy won the Best Rap Album award at the 2007 Grammy Awards. His album then reached number one on the Billboard 200 album charts with sales of 309,000 in its first week. With the release of this album, Ludacris marked a change in style in his career with his musical style. The new album itself features a departure of the lighthearted mood of his previous albums, and introduces a darker side. A change of hair accompanied this as he cut off his trademark braids for a more conventional "fade" cut. To promote the album, Ludacris returned to Saturday Night Live (as both host and musical guest) on November 18, 2006.

2008–2010: Theater of the Mind and Battle of the Sexes
The Preview, a mixtape to preview the album was released on July 28, 2008. Theater of the Mind was released on November 24, 2008, and in April 2008, the single "Let's Stay Together" appeared on xxlmag.com; supposedly from the new album ("Let's Stay Together" was expected to but was released as a bonus track on the CD). A song with Small World called "Pinky Shinin" was expected to be on the album, but it was dropped. In an interview with Complex Magazine he stated that Chris Brown, Lil Wayne, Rick Ross, T.I., Plies, Common, T-Pain, Jay-Z, Nas and The Game will be on the album; Game is featured in a track with Willy Northpole titled "Call Up the Homies". T.I. was on the album on a track called "Wish You Would" squashing the long feud between them. The album debuted at number five on the Billboard 200 with 213,493 sold first week. The album was released the same day as Kanye West's 808s & Heartbreak, which took the number-one spot. His first single "What Them Girls Like", featuring Chris Brown and Sean Garrett, peaked at number 33 on the Billboard Hot 100. His second single, "One More Drink", featuring T-Pain, peaked at number 24 on the Billboard Hot 100. The third official single is "Nasty Girl", featuring Plies. He confirmed a "sequel" titled Ludaversal due to be released September 11, 2012.

Ludacris was featured on Justin Bieber's hit single "Baby", which became one of the highest-certified singles of all time in the US and gained international success. His eighth studio album was released on March 9, 2010, with his first promotional single for the album being "Everybody Drunk" which features Callum Smith, originally featuring Shawnna. The first concept idea of the album was to have Ludacris and Shawnna battle it out on the album back–to–back, but this was later axed upon Shawnna's departure from Disturbing tha Peace, ending her contract on Ludacris' label and joining T-Pain's Nappy Boy Entertainment label. The first official single released from Battle of the Sexes was "How Low", which was released on December 8, 2009. The follow–up single was "My Chick Bad", released on February 23, 2010. The third single is "Sex Room", peaking at number 69 on the Billboard Hot 100. Ludacris's Battle of the Sexes entered the chart at number one, with 137,000 sales in the first week. The album is currently certified gold.

2012–2015: Ludaversal
In 2012, Ludacris released the singles "Representin" and "Rest of My Life," both of which were scrapped after the songs underperformed and the recording process for his upcoming album Ludaversal stalled.

On May 24, 2013, Ludacris released a mixtape entitled #IDGAF. He had been releasing a new song on Fridays as he is calling these releases IDGAF Fridays. These songs, in order of release, were "Raised in the South" featuring rapper Jeezy, released on April 19. That release was followed by "If I Ain't Fucked Up" on April 26, "9 Times Out of 10" featuring rappers French Montana & Que on May 3, "Speak into The Mic" on May 10, and "I Don't Give A Fuck" on May 17. The last song was released a week before the release of the mixtape. The mixtape had almost 60,000 downloads via datpiff.com within the first day. Ludacris reprised his role as Tej in the blockbuster movie Fast & Furious 6, which opened during Memorial Day Weekend, May 2013. Ludacris had this to say about his upcoming new album: "I think every album is like a progression, I'm working with different producers. Usher, We definitely have this album which is a great thing. Ne-Yo is also on the album and I have producers like David Guetta, we have Stargate, have trainees. [The] Kelly Rowland single just came out that you need to check out. It's called 'Representing'".

On August 3, 2013, Ludacris confirmed to VIBE.com he will be working with Anita Baker. "I don't know if the cat's out the bag. Yeah, Anita Baker is definitely on the album," admitted Luda. "She's on that particular song. [It] is really about my father and growing up and me being a kid and trying to get him to stop and me dealing with that."

After a lengthy hiatus, Ludacris returned to the music on January 30, 2014 with the release of a single "Party Girls" featuring Jeremih, Wiz Khalifa and Cashmere Cat. The song takes a cue from Aqua's 1997 song "Barbie Girl"; however, the single did not appear on the new album. On October 9, 2014, Ludacris announced that  Ludaversal would be released on March 31, 2015; which will be preceded by an EP titled Burning Bridges due for release on December 16, 2014. On October 31, 2014 Ludacris premiered the first single from the "Burning Bridges" EP titled "Good Lovin'" featuring American singer Miguel.

Due to its moderate success, "Good Lovin" would go on to serve as the first single from Ludaversal. On March 3, 2015, Ludacris held a listening party for Ludaversal with Def Jam. The tracks "Intro", "Not For Long" featuring Usher, and "Come N See Me" featuring Big K.R.I.T. were revealed to the public After 3 years worth of delays, Ludaversal was released March 31, 2015 to generally positive reviews and peaked at number 3 on the Billboard 200.

2017–present: Upcoming tenth studio album and Karma's World
In March 2017, Ludacris confirmed that he was working on his tenth studio album in an interview with Complex magazine. On March 31, 2017, Ludacris released a new single called "Vitamin D" featuring Ty Dolla $ign.

In 2017, Ludacris hosted YouTube's Best.Cover.Ever show.

In 2018, he was featured on country singer Carrie Underwood's single "The Champion". The song peaked at number 47 on the Billboard Hot 100 and was the opening song for Super Bowl LII and 2018 Winter Olympics and Cry Pretty. On May 8, 2018, Ludacris received three nominations and one win at the 2018 CMT Music Awards.

On October 14, 2020, Netflix commissioned his then-new computer-animated musical children's television series known as Karma's World for an initial 40 episodes from 9 Story Productions, Creative Affairs Group and his production company, Karma's World Entertainment, Using the inspiration of his eldest daughter, Karma Bridges, and the eponymous website created in 2009. Ludacris stated in interviews with People and Billboard that he and Karma "spent close to a decade and a half" working on the "perfection" of the production. The series premiered on Netflix on October 15, 2021 alongside its official soundtrack album, which was produced and released by Def Jam Recordings on global digital music streaming platforms. On January 17, 2022, the series got nominated for three NAACP Image Awards including Outstanding Children's Program and Ludacris himself got nominated for his voice-over performance as Karma's on-screen dad. Netflix renewed Karma's World for a second season on back of the encouragements, which premiered on March 10, 2022.

In August 2021, Ludacris released the single "Butter.ATL".

In December 2022, it was announced that Ludacris would headline Janet Jacksons Together Again Tour.

Personal life
Ludacris has a daughter named Karma Bridges (born August 2001 and the inspiration for/behind Karma's World) from a relationship with an attorney from Atlanta. He also has a daughter, Cai Bella Bridges (born December 2013), with Tamika Fuller, a longtime friend.  From 2009 until their marriage in 2014, he dated model Eudoxie Mbouguiengue.  On December 26, 2014, Ludacris became engaged to Mbouguiengue while in Costa Rica, and the two married later that same day. In early June 2015, Eudoxie announced that the couple had welcomed a baby girl. In May 2021, Eudoxie shared via Instagram that Ludacris and her were expecting their second child together.

In January 2020, Ludacris acquired Gabonese citizenship along with his mother and two daughters.

Business ventures

Ludacris is the founder of his own record label, Disturbing tha Peace, an imprint distributed by Def Jam Recordings. He is the co-owner of Conjure Cognac liquor. In 2011, Ludacris released his own line of headphones called "Soul By Ludacris" manufactured by Soul Electronics. He also has various real estate holdings.

In 2006, Ludacris appeared in a television and print advertising campaign for Puma, which released 3 limited edition models of a "Clyde x Luda" Puma Clyde sneaker, with Ludacris' image on the heel of the insole and "DTP" (for Disturbing tha Peace) on the heel window.

In November 2016, Ludacris opened up a restaurant named "Chicken N Beer" at the Hartsfield-Jackson International Airport in Atlanta.

Philanthropy
In 2011, Ludacris joined a joint effort between Do Something and Better World Books to collect books to help restock library shelves in New Orleans. He filmed a public service announcement in support of the Epic Book Drive.

Ludacris also started the Ludacris Foundation at the beginning of his music career in 2002. The aim of the foundation is to inspire the youth through education, memorable experiences and helping the youth help themselves. The focus is what Ludacris calls the "3Ls": Leadership and Education, Living Healthy Lifestyles, and LudaCares.

In October 2019, Ludacris was named the artist-in-residence at Georgia State University, where he will mentor students in the Creative Media Industries Institute. On April 13, 2022 Georgia State University announced the Georgia Board of Regents approved for Ludacris to receive an honorary Bachelor of Science degree in Music Management. He received this honorary degree on May 4, 2022 at the commencement ceremony at Center Parc Stadium where he also delivered a speech.

Controversy

T.I.
Tensions began when T.I. saw Disturbing tha Peace rapper I-20's video in which a man wearing a shirt with the words "Trap House", was being beaten. T.I. believed the man's shirt actually said "Trap Muzik", perhaps interpreting this to be a reference to his album of the same name. Later, G-Unit artist Young Buck asked these two fellow Southern rappers to appear on his new record on the track "Stomp". T.I. recorded a verse that contained a line that Young Buck considered to be an insult towards Ludacris, "Me gettin' beat down?/That's ludicrous". Young Buck spoke to Ludacris about his interpretation of the event. Ludacris then later recorded a verse that can be found on the album "Straight Outta Cashville". T.I's record company wanted Ludacris to change his verse before they sanctioned it but Ludacris refused and T.I. was therefore replaced by Game on the album version.

On June 24, 2007, at the Sunset Tower Hotel in West Hollywood, California, T.I. was involved in a physical altercation. During a luncheon held by Kevin Liles of Warner Music Group (parent company of T.I.'s label, Atlantic Records), the MC got into a fight with Ludacris' manager Chaka Zulu. According to witnesses, T.I. punched Zulu in the face and choked him and a small, brief melee ensued.

T.I. was awarded honors for Best Hip-Hop Artist at the BET Awards, and took the opportunity to apologize for his scuffle with Disturbing tha Peace executive Chaka Zulu earlier in the week. While accepting his award, he expressed regret over the situation. "They say it's a fine line between brilliance and insanity," he said, in an apparent reference to his troublesome alter ego, T.I.P. During the broadcast, cameras showed his onetime rival Ludacris smiling in the audience.

The two rappers have resolved their disagreement and have collaborated on four songs: "Wish You Would" off Ludacris's sixth studio album Theater of the Mind, "On Top of the World" off T.I.'s sixth studio album Paper Trail, and "We in This Bitch" off DJ Drama's album Quality Street Music. The original version of the latter had Kanye West. The two have also collaborated on Big Boi's song called "In The A", released on the 2012 album Vicious Lies and Dangerous Rumors.

Bill O'Reilly and Pepsi
On August 27, 2002, political pundit Bill O'Reilly called for all Americans to boycott Pepsi products because they hired Ludacris for promotional purposes and O'Reilly objected to Ludacris' style and attitude. The next day, O'Reilly reported that Pepsi had fired Ludacris. Six months later, Russell Simmons and his hip hop action summit threatened a boycott of all PepsiCo products on the grounds that Pepsi had subsequently hired Ozzy Osbourne for a commercial even though Osbourne is notable for use of profanity and explicit lyrics. Eventually an agreement was reached that resulted in PepsiCo donating $3 million to Ludacris' foundation and other inner city charities.

This is referenced in the 2003 songs "Hoes in My Room" as well as "Blow It Out" from Chicken n' Beer. Three years later, this would be referenced again in the song "Number One Spot". During a summer 2003 appearance on MTV's The New Tom Green Show, Ludacris and host Tom Green launched copies of Bill O'Reilly-authored books into a dumpster using a homemade catapult. In an interview with RadarOnline.com in 2010, Ludacris stated that he and O'Reilly had made amends after having a conversation at a charity event.

2008 presidential election
The song "Politics as Usual" from Ludacris' mixtape The Preview has stirred controversy due to lyrics in the song criticizing Jesse Jackson; "Now Jesse talkin' slick and apologizin' for what? If you said it then you meant it" (in reference to Jackson stating that he would "like to cut Obama's nuts off"); John McCain "McCain don't belong in any chair unless he's paralyzed"; President George W. Bush "Yeah I said it, 'cuz Bush is mentally handicapped/Ball up all of his speeches and throw 'em just like candy wraps/'Cuz what you talkin' I hear nothin' even relevant/you the worst of all 43 presidents"; Hillary Clinton "Hillary hated on you, so that bitch is irrelevant", in reference to Hillary's campaign comments against Obama.

Discography

Studio albums
 Incognegro (1999)
 Back for the First Time (2000)
 Word of Mouf (2001)
 Chicken-n-Beer (2003)
 The Red Light District (2004)
 Release Therapy (2006)
 Theater of the Mind (2008)
 Battle of the Sexes (2010)
 Ludaversal (2015)

Soundtracks
 Karma's World Official Soundtrack (2021)

Filmography

See also
 List of artists who reached number one in the United States
 List of awards and nominations received by Ludacris

References

External links

 Official Def Jam Site
 

 
1977 births
Living people
20th-century American rappers
21st-century American businesspeople
21st-century American male actors
21st-century American rappers
21st-century Gabonese businesspeople
21st-century Gabonese rappers
Actors from Oak Park, Illinois
African-American businesspeople
African-American Christians
African-American film producers
African-American male actors
African-American male rappers
African-American record producers
American drink industry businesspeople
American film producers
American hip hop record producers
American male film actors
American male television actors
American male voice actors
American music industry executives
American music managers
American people of English descent
American people who self-identify as being of Native American descent
American philanthropists
American real estate businesspeople
American retail chief executives
Businesspeople from Atlanta
Businesspeople from Chicago
Def Jam Recordings artists
Gabonese Christians
Gabonese film people
Georgia State University alumni
Grammy Award winners for rap music
Male actors from Atlanta
Male actors from Chicago
Male actors from Illinois
Musicians from Champaign, Illinois
Musicians from Oak Park, Illinois
Outstanding Performance by a Cast in a Motion Picture Screen Actors Guild Award winners
People from Centreville, Virginia
People with acquired Gabonese citizenship
Philanthropists from Illinois
Rappers from Atlanta
Rappers from Chicago
Record producers from Illinois
Southern hip hop musicians